Hayao (written: 駿, 隼雄, 速雄 or 駿雄) is a masculine Japanese given name. Notable people with the name include:

, Japanese footballer
, Japanese psychologist
, Japanese military officer
, Japanese film director, producer, screenwriter, animator, writer and manga artist
, Japanese businessman
, Imperial Japanese Navy admiral
, Japanese general

Japanese masculine given names